Pralines, also known as  Belgian chocolates, Belgian chocolate fondants or chocolate bonbons,  are cases of chocolate (if from Belgium usually a quality, branded lower-melting point Belgian chocolate) filled with a soft centre. Jean Neuhaus II, a Belgian chocolatier, is generally credited for their introduction in 1912, although they were probably made since the 19th century.

There have always been many types and shapes: nearly always containing a chocolate shell with a softer filling. Confusion can arise over the use of the word praline in Belgium as it may refer to filled chocolates in general known as pralines  and it may also refer to a traditional praline filling common in Europe (caramelised hazelnuts (noisettes) or almonds (amandes) ground into a paste, sometimes with whey powder, condensed milk or cream) described as praliné . Belgian chocolates (pralines) are not limited to the traditional praliné filling and often include nuts, marzipan, salted caramel, coffee, a spirit, cream liqueur, cherry or a chocolate blend that contrasts with the outer shell. They are often sold in stylised boxes in the form of a gift box. The largest manufacturers are Neuhaus, Godiva, Leonidas, and Guylian.

Contrary to truffles, pralines are very often decorated in a sophisticated manner.

References  

Belgian cuisine
Chocolate